Hakim Miloudi (born 26 June 1993) is a French professional rugby league footballer who plays as a  or er for the Albi XIII in the Elite One Championship in France, and France at international level.

He previously played for Saint-Esteve, AS Carcassonne in France and for Canadian club Toronto Wolfpack in the Betfred Championship and Betfred Super League. Miloudi has also played for Hull F.C. in the Super League, and on loan from Hull at Doncaster in League 1.

Background
Miloudi was born in Perpignan, France.

Playing career

Early career
Miloudi began his career at Saint-Esteve XIII Catalan and played in the Elite One Championship for AS Carcassonne. He represented France at junior international level, winning man of the match for France u18s in a victory over Australian Schoolboys.

Hull F.C.
In 2017 Miloudi joined Hull F.C. on trial and later signed a two year contract. He was then sent on loan to Doncaster. While playing for Doncaster in 2018 he tied the club record for most points scored in a match, scoring 32 points in a victory over Coventry Bears.

On 2 April 2018 he made his Super League début for Hull F.C. against Wakefield Trinity.

Palau XIII Broncos
On 16 October 2020, it was reported that Miloudi had signed for Palau XIII Broncos in the Elite One Championship.

Barrow Raiders
On 10 May 2021 it was reported that he had signed for Barrow Raiders in the RFL League 1

International career
Miloudi made his debut for France in their pre-tournament match against . He was named in France's squad for the 2017 World Cup but was dropped for reportedly missing the bus to the airport. He returned to the French team in 2018 for their match against  and the subsequent 2018 European Championship.

Miloudi was included in France's squad for the 2019 Rugby League World Cup 9s.

References

External links
Toronto Wolfpack profile
Hull F.C. profile

1993 births
Living people
AS Carcassonne players
Barrow Raiders players
Doncaster R.L.F.C. players
France national rugby league team players
French rugby league players
French rugby union players
Hull F.C. players
Palau Broncos players
Racing Club Albi XIII players
Rugby league fullbacks
Rugby league centres
Sportspeople from Perpignan
Toronto Wolfpack players